Loose Loose Arappiri Loose is a 1988 Indian Malayalam-language comedy film written, co-produced, and directed by Prassi Malloor. Starring Jagathy Sreekumar, Mala Aravindan, Kuthiravattam Pappu and Pattom Sadan. The film has a musical score by Darsan Raman.

Plot

Cast

Jagathy Sreekumar as Jagathy
Mala Aravindan as Mala
Kuthiravattam Pappu as Pappu
Pattom Sadan
K. P. A. C. Azeez
Murali
Babitha
Bindu Ghosh
Justin
Nellikode Bhaskaran
Sabitha Anand
Vettoor Purushan as Purushan

Soundtrack
The music was composed by Darsan Raman and the lyrics were written by P. Bhaskaran.

References

External links
 

1988 films
1980s Malayalam-language films